Serge Larcher (born 17 October 1945) was a member of the Senate of France from 2004 to 2017, representing the island of Martinique.  He is a member of the Socialist Party.

References

1945 births
Living people
French Senators of the Fifth Republic
Martiniquais politicians
French people of Martiniquais descent
Socialist Party (France) politicians
Senators of Martinique